Timaios of Elis (5th/4th century BC) was a sportsperson originating from Elis in Ancient Greece.

Sports career 
In 396 BC, he was crowned the victor of the trumpet contest at the 96th ancient Olympic Games, during which he had represented his homeregion of Elis. He was the first person in history to win in that competition.

Notes

References 

Ancient Greek sportspeople
Ancient Eleans
Ancient Olympic competitors
5th-century BC Greek people
4th-century BC Greek people